Brothers is a surname. Notable people with the surname include:
Caroline Brothers ( 2022), Australian-born writer
Cary Brothers (born 1974), American singer-songwriter
Fletcher Brothers, American fundamentalist preacher and author
Jim Brothers (1941–2013), American sculptor
Joyce Brothers (1927–2013), American psychologist and columnist
Kerry Brothers Jr. (born 1970), American songwriter
Leo Vincent Brothers (1899–1950), American gangster and murderer
Paul Brothers, Canadian television personality
Paul Brothers (Canadian football) (born 1945), American football player
Peter Malam Brothers (1917–2008), Battle of Britain pilot
Rex Brothers (born 1987), American baseball player
Richard Brothers (1757–1824), Canadian religious leader and author
Vincent Brothers (born 1962), American mass murderer